The South Fork Cache la Poudre River is a  tributary of the Cache la Poudre River in Larimer County, Colorado.  The river's source is in the Mummy Range of Rocky Mountain National Park.

See also
List of rivers of Colorado

References

Rivers of Larimer County, Colorado
Tributaries of the Platte River
Rivers of Rocky Mountain National Park
Wild and Scenic Rivers of the United States